This is a list of professional wrestling television series.

Territory-era (1950s–1970s)

1980s wrestling boom

1990s wrestling boom

Modern-era (2002–present)

International Broadcasters

See also
Monday Night Wars
Wednesday Night Wars
List of current WWE programming
List of former WWE television programming
List of Impact Wrestling programming

References
General

Specific

External links

 
Television series